Sera Gamble is an American television writer and producer, best known for her work on the Lifetime/Netflix series You, the Syfy series The Magicians and The CW series Supernatural.

Early and personal life 
Born in New York City, Gamble was briefly raised in Cincinnati before moving to Redlands, California. She graduated from the UCLA School of Theater, Film and Television.

Gamble is Jewish, and formerly co-blogged "Very Hot Jews" with Simon Glickman.

Gamble is married to Eric Weiss. Their wedding took place in September 2019. Currently, they reside in Los Angeles, California.

Career
Before turning to film and television, Gamble starred in stage productions of Will Strip for Food in Los Angeles and Dublin, Ireland. She produced and starred in a stage production of Eve of Paradise, written and directed by Raelle Tucker. She also starred in a short film written and directed by Tucker, entitled The Clay Man; the film was based on a short story by Gamble.

Gamble has published several works of literary short fiction, including stories published by the journal Washington Square, on nerve.com, and anthologized in the 2006 and 2007 editions of The Best American Erotica and the "dark, gothic" collection Bitten.

Television 
Gamble's career in Hollywood began when she appeared as a finalist on the second season of Project Greenlight in 2003. She was hired as a writer on the short-lived ABC series Eyes.

Following that series' cancellation, she was hired as a writer and story editor on the CW series Supernatural. Gamble was part of the writing team on Supernatural for its first seven seasons. She contributed some thirty scripts for the series and was made an executive producer in season five.  At the end of the fifth season, creator Eric Kripke stepped down as head writer of the series and Gamble was chosen as his successor. She served as the series' showrunner beginning with the sixth season, and ending with the end of the seventh season.

Gamble chose to step down from her post as showrunner and executive producer on Supernatural at the end of the seventh season in order to "focus on developing other material" for Warner Bros. Television, including pilots for ABC and The CW television networks. She was replaced by Being Human executive producer Jeremy Carver, who worked on Supernatural from seasons 3 to 5.

Gamble worked as a writer and executive producer for two seasons of the NBC period drama Aquarius. She appears in a cameo role in episode 7 of season one. While working together on Aquarius, she and John McNamara co-created and executive produced the television adaptation of Lev Grossman's New York Times bestselling novel The Magicians for the Syfy network. With McNamara, she serves as the series' showrunner. The Magicians was renewed for a second season in 2016, a third season in 2017, a fourth season in 2018 and a fifth season that premiered on January 15, 2020. In March 2020, Syfy announced that the fifth season would be the series' final season.

While working together on Aquarius, Gamble, John McNamara and Alexandra Cunningham formed the production company, Fabrication.  Fabrication's current development slate includes adaptations of The Lizard Kings and The Persuaders.

Gamble and Greg Berlanti co-created and executive produce the television adaptation of Caroline Kepnes's bestselling novel You. Currently, Gamble serves as the primary showrunner of the series. You was initially renewed for a second season by Lifetime before the first season aired. The first season of You began airing on Lifetime in September 2018, garnering positive reviews from the New York Times, New Yorker, and Los Angeles Times. On December 3, 2018, it was announced that the series would move to Netflix as a "Netflix Original" title, ahead of the premiere of the second season, after Lifetime reneged on the renewal deal. The second season was released exclusively on Netflix on December 26, 2019. On January 14, 2020, You was renewed for a third season by Netflix. The third season was released on October 15, 2021. In October 2021, ahead of the third season premiere, the series was renewed for a fourth season.

In January 2021, it was announced that Gamble and Berlanti would reunite to develop a television series based on the novel Providence by Kepnes for Peacock.

Filmography

Film

Television
The numbers in writing credits refer to the number of episodes.

References

External links

Television producers from California
American women television producers
American television writers
Jewish American writers
Living people
American women television writers
Place of birth missing (living people)
1983 births
People from Redlands, California
UCLA Film School alumni
Screenwriters from New York (state)
Screenwriters from California
Jewish women writers
21st-century American Jews
21st-century American women